"Zapomnij mi"  is a single by Polish singer Sarsa. The song was released as the third single from her debut studio album Zapomnij mi on 7 December 2015, and was written by Sarsa with production by Sarsa along with Tomasz Konfederak.

The single reached number 1 on the Polish Airplay – New Chart and was a top ten hit on the Polish Airplay chart. An official remix of the song featuring Polish DJ Tom Swoon was released on 5 February 2016.

Music video 
A music video to accompany the release of "Zapomnij mi" was released on 26 November 2015 through Sarsa's Vevo channel. It was directed by Alan Kępski.

Track listing

Charts and certifications

Weekly charts

Certifications

Release history

References

2015 songs
2015 singles
Sarsa (singer) songs
Universal Music Group singles
Polish-language songs